Arjun Pandit (born 21 June 1959) is a retired male marathon runner from Nepal. He represented his native country in the men's marathon at the 1984 Summer Olympics in Los Angeles, California, finishing 63rd.

References

External links
 

1959 births
Living people
Nepalese male marathon runners
Athletes (track and field) at the 1984 Summer Olympics
Olympic athletes of Nepal
Place of birth missing (living people)
20th-century Nepalese people